Garden City Regional Airport  is nine miles southeast of Garden City, in Finney County, Kansas, United States. It sees one scheduled airline, subsidized by the federal government's Essential Air Service program at a cost of $2,919,026 (per year).

The National Plan of Integrated Airport Systems for 2021–2025 categorized it as a primary commercial service airport.

History
During World War II the United States Army Air Forces used Garden City Airport as a training airfield by the Army Air Forces Flying Training Command, Gulf Coast Training Center. The facility was called Garden City Army Airfield.
 
The main Garden City Army Airfield and its auxiliaries closed in November 1945 and were declared excess by the military on 18 May 1947. Civil authorities developed the main airfield into Garden City Regional Airport.

Continental DC-3s landed at GCK from about 1946 until replaced by Central in 1961; successor Frontier's Convairs left in 1977. Earlier, Continental had landed at the old municipal airport three miles east of town.

Garden City Regional Airport's status as former Garden City AAF made it important during the terrorist attacks of September 11, 2001. When orders were dispatched to ground all domestic flights, three large jets were told to land at GCRA, the closest airport large enough for them. The airport had no stairs for large airliners and the passengers had to be evacuated by Garden City Fire Department ladder trucks.

In December 2011 the EAS program awarded American Eagle Airlines two daily non-stop flights to Dallas-Fort Worth.

Facilities
The airport covers 1,848 acres (748 ha) at an elevation of 2,891 feet (881 m). It has two concrete runways: 17/35 is 7,299 by 100 feet (2,225 x 30 m) and 12/30 is 5,700 by 100 feet (1,737 x 30 m).

In the year ending June 30, 2020 the airport had 15,003 aircraft operations, an average of 41 per day: 79% general aviation, 20% air taxi and 1% military. In December 2021, 62 aircraft were based at this airport: 53 single-engine, 5 multi-engine and 4 jet.

Airline and destination

Statistics

References

Other sources

 Essential Air Service documents (Docket DOT-OST-1998-3503) from the U.S. Department of Transportation:
 Order 2009-9-5 (September 11, 2009): re-selecting Great Lakes Aviation, Ltd., to provide essential air service (EAS) at Dodge City, Garden City, Great Bend, Hays, and Liberal for the two-year period from October 1, 2009, through September 30, 2011, at combined annual subsidy rates of $8,897,565. Garden City, Kansas: Docket OST-1998-3503; Effective Period: Start of Denver-Only service through September 30, 2011; Scheduled Service: 30 nonstop round trips per week to Denver; Aircraft: Beech 1900, 19 seats.
 Order 2011-10-24 (October 31, 2011): selecting American Eagle Airlines to provide essential air service (EAS) at Garden City for $2,919,026 annual subsidy. Effective Period: Two year period beginning when American Eagle begins full EAS through the 24th month thereafter. Service: 14 nonstop round trips per week to Dallas. Aircraft: Embraer Regional Jet.
 Order 2014-3-9 (March 14, 2014): selecting American Airlines to provide Essential Air Service (EAS) at Garden City, Kansas. Garden City, Kansas: Docket 1998-3503; Effective Period: May 1, 2014, through July 31, 2016; Service: Fourteen (14) nonstop round trips per week to Dallas (DFW); Aircraft Type: 44-seat or larger Regional Jet; Annual Subsidy: $1,445,172.

External links
 
  from Kansas DOT Airport Directory
 Aerial image as of September 1991 from USGS The National Map
 
 

Airports in Kansas
Essential Air Service
Buildings and structures in Finney County, Kansas
Airports established in 1942
1942 establishments in Kansas